SAM 26000 was the first of two Boeing VC-137C United States Air Force aircraft specifically configured and maintained for use by the president of the United States. It used the callsign Air Force One when the president was on board, otherwise SAM 26000 (spoken as 'SAM two-six-thousand'), with SAM indicating Special Air Mission.

A VC-137C with Air Force serial number 62-6000, SAM 26000 was a customized Boeing 707.  It entered service in 1962 during the administration of John F. Kennedy and was replaced in presidential service in 1972 but kept as a backup. The aircraft was finally retired in 1998 and is now on display at the National Museum of the United States Air Force near Dayton, Ohio.

The aircraft was built at Boeing's Renton plant at a cost of $8 million. Raymond Loewy, working with President Kennedy, designed the blue and white color scheme featuring the presidential seal that is still used today. The plane served as the primary means of transportation for three presidents: Kennedy, Lyndon B. Johnson, and Richard Nixon during his first term. In 1972, during the Nixon administration, the plane was replaced by another 707, SAM 27000, although SAM 26000 was kept as a back-up plane until 1998.

John F. Kennedy and Lyndon B. Johnson

John F. Kennedy was the first president to use SAM 26000. Kennedy first flew on the aircraft on November 10, 1962, to attend the funeral services of former First Lady Eleanor Roosevelt in Hyde Park, New York. SAM 26000 took Kennedy to Berlin ("Ich bin ein Berliner") in June 1963; the month before that, it set a new Washington-Moscow time record. It was designer Raymond Loewy who, at the invitation of First Lady Jacqueline Kennedy, gave SAM 26000 the now-familiar Air Force One livery of blue, silver, and white.

On November 22, 1963, after landing the President and First Lady at Dallas' Love Field, SAM 26000 was the backdrop to live broadcasts of the Kennedys greeting well-wishers. Later that day, after Kennedy's assassination made Vice President Lyndon Johnson the new president, SAM 26000 carried the Johnsons, Jacqueline Kennedy, and Kennedy's body back to Washington. To accommodate the casket four seats were removed from the passenger compartment; Johnson took the Oath of Office (see photo) aboard SAM 26000 before takeoff. The casket was on board because Mrs. Kennedy refused to leave her husband's body and under no circumstances, would Johnson leave without her.

As Kennedy was laid to rest in Arlington National Cemetery, SAM 26000 flew overhead, following 50 fighter jets (20 Navy and 30 Air Force).

Johnson was SAM 26000's most frequent flyer, logging some 523,000 miles during his five years as president; he once called it "my own little plane." New seats were installed, now facing rearward toward the presidential cabin, in which was installed a spacious leather chair (dubbed "the throne") and a crescent-shaped table which the president could raise and lower by means of a switch.  Aides and guests sat on couches around "the throne."

Johnson flew in SAM 26000 twice to Vietnam and took tours of Asia in 1968 and 1969. In 1967, Johnson went on a largely unplanned aerial odyssey, making stops in California, Hawaii, Australia, Thailand, South Vietnam, Pakistan, and Italy.

Richard M. Nixon

Upon the inauguration of Richard Nixon in 1969, SAM 26000 underwent repairs and upgrades. Nixon and his staff were offered a key role in the redesigning of the plane, a position they took up, and indeed, the finished plane reflected the new president's persona. The interior of the plane was stripped from the nose to the tail; all minor problems were taken care of; upgrades were made on the flight management system; communications gear was slightly modified. Richard Nixon had the interior of the plane redesigned to suit his fancy. Nixon did away with the open floor plan of the Johnson era and replaced it with a three-room suite for himself and his family, serving as a combination of lounge, office, and bedrooms. Accommodations for guests, aides, security and media personnel were located aft of the three rooms.

Although SAM 27000 took over as the primary presidential aircraft in 1972, Nixon's family preferred SAM 26000 because its interior configuration allowed greater privacy for the First Family. Nixon also had the name "The Spirit of '76" applied to the nose of both VC-137Cs. The Nixons flew on SAM 26000 to China in 1972, becoming the first American President and First Lady to visit that nation. SAM 26000 was also used by National Security Advisor Henry Kissinger during his secret meetings with the French to negotiate the Vietnam peace process. In December 1972, SAM 27000 took over as the primary presidential plane.

Missions after replacement

Death and state funeral of LBJ
On January 22, 1973, Lyndon B. Johnson died. Two days later, SAM 26000 brought the former president's body from Texas to Washington, D.C., for the state funeral the following day. After the funeral, over which Nixon himself presided, the aircraft returned his body to Texas for burial, landing at Bergstrom Air Force Base in Austin, the airfield Johnson flew into and out of when president. As the former president was interred at his ranch, retired Brigadier General James U. Cross, pilot of SAM 26000 during part of the Johnson presidency, presented the flag to Lady Bird Johnson at her request. He also escorted her during the state funeral, again, at her request, saying that she did not know Army Major General James Adamson, then commanding general of the Military District of Washington (MDW). Most of this resulted from Mrs. Johnson agreeing to the public honors in Washington, though her husband died in Texas, because she felt so many others from around the world wanted to join in—40,000 people paid their respects when the former president lay in state, even though the mood during the state funeral was one of intense recrimination because the wounds of the Vietnam War were still raw. Because of SAM 26000, the final services honoring LBJ on January 25 were completed in one day, despite taking place in different parts of the country.

Other memorable missions
On October 6, 1981, Egyptian President Anwar Sadat was assassinated. Because of security concerns, then-President Ronald Reagan did not attend the funeral. Instead, he sent Secretary of State Alexander Haig and the living former presidents—Nixon, Ford, and Carter—to the funeral, as well as former secretary of state Henry Kissinger. All of them flew aboard SAM 26000 when traveling to the funeral.

The last time SAM 26000 carried a serving president was in January 1998 when President Bill Clinton's Air Force One, SAM 27000, got stuck in the mud in Champaign, Illinois, at University of Illinois Willard Airport. SAM 26000 was sitting at Grissom Air Reserve Base in Peru, Indiana, to serve as the backup Air Force One.  SAM 26000 was quickly dispatched to Champaign to pick up President Clinton, who then flew to La Crosse, Wisconsin, for an event and then flew the final presidential service flight from La Crosse to Washington, D.C., where SAM 26000 was then officially retired from the president's fleet.

Current status
In May 1998, SAM 26000 was flown to the National Museum of the United States Air Force at Wright-Patterson AFB near Dayton, Ohio. Its final flight was staged over the museum grounds for the benefit of the media and museum visitors. The aircraft circled the museum several times at low altitude before finally landing on the original Wright Field airstrip alongside the museum. The plane taxied to the museum's restoration hangars and the crew disembarked, while members of the press explored the aircraft. After several months of work by the museum's restoration staff, the aircraft was placed on permanent display in the museum's Presidential Hangar. The public can walk through the aircraft; while the original intent (according to museum personnel) was to restore the aircraft to how it looked when Kennedy was President, it was later determined to leave the aircraft interior as it looked when it was delivered to the U.S. Air Force Museum in May, 1998.  In December 2009, SAM 26000 was taken off display and moved to the museum's restoration area, where it was repainted into its Presidential paint scheme.  SAM 26000 was later returned to the Presidential Planes Hangar at the museum.

See also

Notes

References

The main sources for this article are the following books:

 SAM 26000 at the National Museum of the USAF

Transportation of the president of the United States
Assassination of John F. Kennedy
Individual aircraft
Presidential aircraft
Equipment of the United States Air Force
Boeing 707
Collection of the National Museum of the United States Air Force